Sabah District  is a district of the Al Bayda Governorate, Yemen. As of 2003, the district had a population of 27,472 inhabitants.

References

Districts of Al Bayda Governorate